This is an incomplete list of Statutory Instruments made in the United Kingdom in the year 2013.

1-100
The A55 Trunk Road (Conwy Tunnel, Conwy) (Temporary Traffic Restriction & Prohibitions) Order 2013 SI 2013/1
The A470 Trunk Road (Llanbrynmair, Powys) (Temporary Prohibition of Vehicles) Order 2013 SI 2013/2
The A4076 Trunk Road (South of Johnston, Pembrokeshire) (Temporary Traffic Restrictions & Prohibition) Order 2013 SI 2013/3
The Great Western Ambulance Service National Health Service Trust (Dissolution) Order 2013 SI 2013/4
The Tonnage Tax (Training Requirement) (Amendment) Regulations 2013 SI 2013/5
Scotland Act 2012 (Commencement No. 3) Order
Scotland Act 2012 (Transitional and Consequential Provisions) Order
National Savings Bank (Amendment) Regulations
Criminal Legal Aid (General) Regulations
Energy Performance of Buildings (England and Wales) etc. (Amendment) Regulations
A4042 Trunk Road (Llanellen to Hardwick Gyratory, Abergavenny, Monmouthshire) (Temporary Traffic Restrictions and Prohibitions) Order
A48 and A466 Trunk Roads (High Beech Roundabout, Near Chepstow, Monmouthshire) (Temporary Traffic Restrictions and Prohibition) Order
Taxation of Chargeable Gains (Gilt-edged Securities) Order
A465 Trunk Road (Saltings Viaduct, Neath Interchange, Neath Port Talbot) (Temporary Prohibition of Vehicles) Order
Non-Domestic Rating (Small Business Rate Relief) (England) (Amendment) Order
A4232 Trunk Road (Culverhouse Cross to Capel Llanilltern, Cardiff) (Temporary Prohibition of Vehicles) Order
A4042 Trunk Road (Cwmbran Roundabout to Court Farm Roundabout, Torfaen) (Temporary Traffic Restrictions & Prohibition) Order
Children and Families (Wales) Measure 2010 (Commencement No. 6) Order
M4 Motorway (Junctions 16–17) (Temporary Restriction of Traffic) Order
M5 Motorway (Junctions 11A-12) (Temporary Restriction and Prohibition of Traffic) Order
A38 Trunk Road (Ivybridge, Devon) (Temporary Restriction and Prohibition of Traffic) Order
Driving Licences (Exchangeable Licences) (Amendment) Order
Plant Health (England) (Amendment) Order
Proceeds of Crime Act 2002 (Appeals Under Part 2) (Amendment) Order
A19 Trunk Road (Stockton Road Interchange to Portrack Interchange) (Temporary Prohibition of Traffic) Order
M1 Motorway (Junction 38 to Junction 39) (Temporary Restriction and Prohibition of Traffic) Order
M1 Motorway (Junction 36, Tankersley) (Temporary Restriction and Prohibition of Traffic) Order
A64 Trunk Road (Fulford Interchange) (Temporary Restriction and Prohibition of Traffic) Order
A1(M) Motorway (Junction 42 to Junction 43) (Temporary Restriction and Prohibition of Traffic) Order
A1(M) Motorway and the M62 Motorway (Holmfield Interchange) (Temporary Prohibition of Traffic) Order
M1 Motorway (Junction 42, Lofthouse) (Temporary Prohibition of Traffic) Order
A14 and A428 Trunk Roads (Junction 31 Girton Interchamge, Cambridgeshire) (Temporary Restriction and Prohibition of Traffic) Order
A47 Trunk Road (Oversley Lodge Roundabout to Knarr Fen Road, Thorney, City of Peterborough) (Temporary Restriction and Prohibition of Traffic) Order
A47 Trunk Road (Wisbech, Cambridgeshire to Terrington St John, Norfolk) (Temporary Restriction and Prohibition of Traffic) Order
A1 Trunk Road (Scotch Corner to Catterick) (Temporary Restriction and Prohibition of Traffic) Order
A1 Trunk Road (Leeming to Barton) (Temporary Restriction and Prohibition of Traffic) Order
A1 Trunk Road (Gateshead Quays Interchange) (Temporary Prohibition of Traffic) Order
Assured and Protected Tenancies (Lettings to Students) (Amendment) (England) Regulations
County Council of Somerset (Bridgwater & Taunton Canal Bridge) Scheme 2011 Confirmation Instrument
M11 Motorway (Junction 14 Girton Interchange) Northbound Exit Slip Road (Temporary Prohibition of Traffic) Order
Social Security (Information-sharing in relation to Welfare Services etc.) (Amendment) Regulations
A19 Trunk Road (Dudley Lane Interchange to Moor Farm Roundabout) (Temporary Restriction and Prohibition of Traffic) Order
A47 Trunk Road (Soke Parkway, Junction 17 Bretton Way Interchange to Junction 20 Paston Parkway Interchange, City of Peterborough) (Temporary Restriction and Prohibition of Traffic) Order
A30 Trunk Road (Newtown Roundabout, Longrock, Cornwall) (Temporary Restriction and Prohibition of Traffic) Order
A38 Trunk Road (Forder Valley to Manadon Road, Plymouth) (Temporary Prohibition of Traffic) Order
A38 Trunk Road (Buckfastleigh to Lee Mill, Devon) (Temporary Prohibition of Traffic) Order
M5 Motorway (Junction 25) (Temporary Restriction and Prohibition of Traffic) Order
A38 Trunk Road (Ivybridge to South Brent, Devon) (Temporary Restriction of Traffic) Order
M6 Motorway (Junctions 32–33, Northbound Carriageway) (Temporary Restriction of Traffic) Order
Gwynedd Council (Construction of Pont Briwet Road Bridge) Scheme 2011 Confirmation Instrument
Civil Enforcement of Parking Contraventions (County Borough of Vale of Glamorgan) Designation Order
Air Navigation (Restriction of Flying) (Jet Formation Display Teams) (RAF Cranwell) Regulations
Civil Enforcement of Parking Contraventions (County Borough of Bridgend) Designation Order
Air Navigation (Restriction of Flying) (Cheltenham Festival) Regulations
A66 Trunk Road (Walk Mill to Brough) (Temporary Restriction and Prohibition of Traffic) Order
M6 Motorway (Junctions 32-33 Northbound and Southbound Carriageways) (Temporary Restriction of Traffic) Order
M1 Motorway (Junction 35A to Junction 36) (Temporary Restriction of Traffic) Order
M1 Motorway (Junction 13 to Junction 15, Milton Keynes) (Temporary Restriction and Prohibition of Traffic) Order
Walsall Hospitals National Health Service Trust (Establishment) Amendment Order
M6 Motorway (Junction 23 Northbound and Southbound Slip Roads) and Rob Lane Motorway Depot Slip Roads (Temporary Prohibition of Traffic) Order
M6 Motorway (Junction 39-40 Harrowstead to Thrimby Northbound Carriageway) (Temporary Restriction of Traffic) Order
Council Tax (Administration and Enforcement) (Amendment) (Wales) Regulations
Council Tax (Demand Notices) (Wales) (Amendment) Regulations
Public Bodies (Abolition of the Railway Heritage Committee) Order
Passenger Car (Fuel Consumption and  Emissions Information) (Amendment) Regulations
Boston (Electoral Changes) Order
Finance Act 2009, Sections 101 and 102 (Machine Games Duty) (Appointed Day) Order
Northamptonshire (Electoral Changes) Order
Purbeck (Electoral Changes) Order
Tonbridge and Malling (Electoral Changes) Order
M6 Motorway (Junctions 32-31A Southbound Carriageway) and the M55 (Junction 1 Eastbound Carriageway and Link Roads to the M6 Northbound and Southbound) (Temporary Restriction of Traffic) Order
A47 Trunk Road (Soke Parkway, Junction 20 Paston Parkway Interchange to Junction 17 Bretton Way Interchange, City of Peterborough) Westbound (Temporary Restriction and Prohibition of Traffic) Order
A1 Trunk Road (A1/A1(M) Alconbury Interchange, Cambridgeshire) Southbound Entry Slip Road (Temporary Prohibition of Traffic) Order
A14 Trunk Road (Huntingdon and Swavesey, Cambridgeshire) Lay-bys  (Temporary Prohibition of Traffic) Order
M1 Motorway (Junction 44 and Junction 45) (Temporary Prohibition of Traffic) Order
Air Navigation (Restriction of Flying) (Northampton Sywell) Regulations
Legal Aid, Sentencing and Punishment of Offenders Act 2012 (Commencement No. 5 and Saving Provision) Order
M1 Motorway and the A42 Trunk Road (M1 Junction 23a) (Temporary Prohibition of Traffic) Order
M6 Motorway (Junction 10, Walsall) (Temporary Prohibition of Traffic) Order
M69 Motorway (M69 Junction 1 to M1 Junction 21) (Temporary Prohibition of Traffic) Order
A5 Trunk Road (North East of Nuneaton, Warwickshire) (Temporary Restriction and Prohibition of Traffic) Order
M5  Motorway (Frankley, Worcestershire) (Temporary Restriction of Traffic) Order
M69 Motorway (Junction 1) (Slip Roads) (Temporary Prohibition of Traffic) Order
A43 Trunk Road (Blisworth, Northamptonshire) (Temporary Restriction and Prohibition of Traffic) Order
M1 Motorway (Junctions 18 to 19) (Temporary Prohibition of Traffic) Order
Air Navigation (Restriction of Flying) (Stonehenge) Regulations
Air Navigation (Restriction of Flying) (Glastonbury Festival) Regulations
Air Navigation (Restriction of Flying) (Abingdon Air and Country Show) Regulations
Air Navigation (Restriction of Flying) (Duxford Aerodrome) Regulations
Air Navigation (Restriction of Flying) (Royal Air Force Waddington) Regulations
A470 Trunk Road (Llanrwst, Conwy) (Temporary Prohibition of Vehicles, Cyclists and Pedestrians) Order
Recovery of Costs Insurance Premiums in Clinical Negligence Proceedings Regulations
Offers to Settle in Civil Proceedings Order
Air Navigation (Restriction of Flying) (Vauxhall Bridge) Regulations
Air Navigation (Restriction of Flying) (Vauxhall Bridge) (Revocation) Regulations
A14 Trunk Road (Burton Latimer, Northamptonshire) (Temporary Prohibition of Traffic) Order
A38 Trunk Road (Barton-under-Needwood, Staffordshire) (Slip Roads) (Temporary Prohibition of Traffic) Order
A421 Trunk Road (Bedford Southern Bypass, Elstow, Bedfordshire) Slip Roads (Temporary Prohibition of Traffic) Order
Political Parties and Elections Act 2009 (Commencement No. 6) Order
A14 Trunk Road (near Naseby, Northamptonshire) (Temporary Prohibition of Traffic) Order

201-300
Timber and Timber Products (Placing on the Market) Regulations 2013, SI 233/2013

References
Legislation.gov.uk. UK Statutory Instruments from 2013.

See also
List of Statutory Instruments of the United Kingdom

Lists of Statutory Instruments of the United Kingdom
Statutory Instruments
Statutory Instruments